The 2020–21 Utah State Aggies men's basketball team represented Utah State University in the 2020–21 NCAA Division I men's basketball season. The Aggies, led by third-year head coach Craig Smith, played their home games at the Smith Spectrum in Logan, Utah as members of the Mountain West Conference. They finished the season 20–9, 15–4 in Mountain West play to finish in second place. In the Mountain West tournament, they defeated UNLV and Colorado State before losing to San Diego State in the championship game. They received an at-large bid to the NCAA tournament as the No. 11 seed in the South region, where they lost to Texas Tech in the first round.

Following the season, Smith left the school to accept the head-coaching position at Utah. Shortly thereafter, the school named UMBC head coach Ryan Odom the team's new head coach.

Previous season
The Aggies finished the 2019–20 season 26–8, 12–6 in Mountain West play to finish in a three-way tie for second place. They defeated New Mexico, Wyoming and San Diego State to become champions of the Mountain West tournament, their second consecutive Mountain West tournament championship. As a result, they received the conference's automatic bid to the NCAA tournament. However, on March 12, 2021, the NCAA Tournament was canceled due to the ongoing COVID-19 pandemic.

Roster

Schedule and results

|-
!colspan=9 style=| Regular season

|-
!colspan=9 style=| Mountain West tournament 

|-
!colspan=9 style=| NCAA tournament 

Source

References 

Utah State
Utah State Aggies men's basketball seasons
Utah State Aggies Men's Basketball
Utah State Aggies Men's Basketball
Utah State